Parliamentary elections were held in Greece on 22 September 1996. The ruling PASOK of Costas Simitis was re-elected, defeating the liberal-conservative New Democracy party of Miltiadis Evert.

Results

References

Parliamentary elections in Greece
1990s in Greek politics
Greece
Legislative
Greece